Jonathan Sanger (born April 21, 1944, in Brooklyn, New York) is an American film, television, and theater producer and director.

Early life and career
Sanger spent much of his early childhood traveling with his family around Central and South America. Sanger's interest in theater stemmed from his undergraduate years at the University of Pennsylvania, where he was Chairman of the Board of The Pennsylvania Players, and President of the Performing Arts Council. At the graduate level, Sanger attended the Annenberg School of Communications at the University of Pennsylvania, studying documentary and biography based filmmaking. After graduating, Sanger joined the Peace Corps in a special program with an emphasis on television and film production. Sanger was assigned to help create an Educational Television station in Montevideo, Uruguay. He later transferred to Bogotá, Colombia, to make films for ICODES, the Colombian Institute of Social Development. After his Peace Corps term was completed, Sanger worked on documentary films in Ecuador, Chile and Mexico for NBC's International Zone. Soon after, he became Associate Editor for Americás, a cultural magazine published by The Organization of American States, where he wrote and translated articles. Sanger was contracted by the Encyclopædia Britannica to write the article on Bogotá, Colombia for Britannica 3.

Film
In 1971, Sanger was accepted as a member of the Directors Guild of America Training Program, and worked on several films shot in New York City, among which were Across 110th Street, Harry and Tonto and Next Stop, Greenwich Village. Moving to Los Angeles in 1976, Sanger worked for Lorimar Television on the network Television series The Blue Knight and Eight Is Enough. In 1978, he was Mel Brooks' Assistant Director on High Anxiety, which led to a long professional association. For Brooks' wife, Anne Bancroft's feature directorial debut Fatso, Sanger served as Associate Producer. During this period, Sanger had acquired the rights to the script of The Elephant Man.
Sanger brought the script to Brooks' newly created independent production company, and The Elephant Man was chosen as the company's first project; it was Sanger's debut feature film producing credit. It received  eight Academy Award nominations, including Best Picture, and was awarded the BAFTA Award for Best Film in 1980 and the French César Award for Best Foreign Film.

Film producing
Sanger has produced over fifty films, shorts and documentaries, including the 1982 film Frances, a biography starring Jessica Lange, Kim Stanley and Sam Shepard. Sanger joined Cruise/Wagner Productions (Tom Cruise and Paula Wagner's production company) in 1996. He executive produced Without Limits, Suspect Zero and Vanilla Sky as well as supervising production on Mission: Impossible 2 as well as all the Cruise/Wagner Productions over his six years with that company. Other films produced by Sanger include Flight of the Navigator  for Walt Disney Productions, The Doctor and the Devils for Twentieth Century Fox, The Producers, 100 Feet, and Paraíso Travel

Directing career
Among Sanger's directing credits are: Code Name: Emerald, a World War II spy drama; Down Came a Blackbird a television film for Showtime Networks, nominated for three CableACE Awards; and several movies-of-the-week for NBC, CBS and ABC. In addition to writing numerous episodic television shows, Sanger also wrote and directed the short film Peacemaker, with Lukas Haas, for PBS' American Playhouse, which was awarded the Best Short Subject at the Houston International Film Festival.

Chanticleer Films
In the late 1980s Sanger partnered with fellow producer Jana Sue Memel to create Chanticleer Films as an umbrella company for The Discovery Program. The mission statement of this company was to create an opportunity for film professionals (writers, editors, actors, sound mixers, cinematographers, etc.) to direct a 35mm feature-quality short film. Hundreds of professionals applied for the five directing spots available annually. In the eight years of Sanger's involvement, over forty five films were made; ten were nominated for an Academy Award, and three won. The first film produced by Sanger for the program, Ray's Male Heterosexual Dance Hall,  won the Academy Award for Best Short Film in 1988.

The Academy Film Archive houses the Chanticleer Films Discovery and Directed by Shorts Collection, consisting of 35mm prints and elements for more than sixty short films.

Theater
In 2008, Sanger produced his first musical, the true story of Florence Greenberg, pioneer rock and roll record producer, entitled Baby It's You. The musical started as a workshop production in a West Hollywood theater before moving to the Pasadena Playhouse.  Warner Brothers Theatrical Ventures and Universal Music Group became producing partners, and the show made its Broadway debut in March 2010. Sanger has several other musicals in development and also directed his first play, the dystopian drama, The Birthday Present - 2050 in 2010.

Filmography
He was a producer in all films unless otherwise noted.

Film

As director

Second unit director or assistant director

Production manager

As an actor

As writer

Miscellaneous crew

Thanks

Television

As director

Production manager

As an actor

Other achievements
In addition to twenty Academy Award nominations and three wins, Sanger has won a Christopher Award, a BAFTA ( BAFTA Award for Best Film ), a César Award, Scholastic Magazine's Bell Ringer Award,  and a Cine Golden Eagle Award CINE. Sanger was named Filmmaker-in-Residence at Chapman University's Dodge College of Film And Media Arts during the Spring semester of 2010, and was made Adjunct Professor in 2011, teaching a course in Creative Producing. He has been a member of the Academy of Motion Picture Arts and Sciences since 1981, and a member of the Directors Guild of America (DGA) since 1971, serving on its National Board.  His other professional organizations include The Producers Guild of America (PGA), The Academy of Television Arts and Sciences, and the Screen Actors Guild (SAG-AFTRA). In 2016, McFarland & Co. Inc. published Sanger's new book, Making The Elephant Man: A Producer's Memoir.

Family
Sanger is married to Carla Sanger, and has two sons: David and Christopher Sanger. He has two grandsons, Harrison and Miles Sanger and two grand daughters, Zada and Liliana.

References

External links

1944 births
Film producers from New York (state)
American television directors
Television producers from New York City
Living people
People from Brooklyn
Film directors from New York City
Filmmakers who won the Best Film BAFTA Award
Producers who won the Live Action Short Film Academy Award